The hour record is the record for the longest distance cycled in one hour on a bicycle from a stationary start. Cyclists attempt this record alone on the track without other competitors present. It is considered one of the most prestigious records in cycling. Since it was first set, cyclists ranging from unknown amateurs to well-known professionals have held the record, adding to its prestige, romance and allure. There is now one unified record for upright bicycles meeting the requirements of the Union Cycliste Internationale (UCI). Hour-record attempts for UCI bikes are made in a velodrome.

Early hour records (until 1972) 

The first universally accepted record was in 1876 when the American Frank Dodds rode  on a penny-farthing. The first recorded distance was set in 1873 by James Moore in Wolverhampton, riding an Ariel 49" high wheel bicycle; however, the distance was recorded at exactly , leading to the theory that the distance was just approximated and not accurately measured.

The first officially recognised record was set by Henri Desgrange at the Buffalo Velodrome, Paris in 1893 following the formation of the International Cycling Association, the forerunner of the modern-day UCI. Throughout the run up to the First World War, the record was broken on five occasions by Frenchmen Oscar Egg and Marcel Berthet, and due to the attempts being highly popular and guaranteeing rich attendances, it is said that each ensured he did not beat the record by too much of a margin, enabling further lucrative attempts by the other.

The hour was attempted sporadically over the following 70 years, with most early attempts taking place at the Buffalo Velodrome in Paris, before the Velodromo Vigorelli in Milan became popular in 1930s and 1940s sparking attempts from leading Italian riders and former Giro d'Italia winners such as Fausto Coppi and Ercole Baldini. Coppi's record set in 1942, during the Second World War, despite Milan being bombed nightly by Allied forces, was eventually broken in 1956 by Jacques Anquetil on his third attempt. He had objected to what he saw as the indignity of having to urinate in a tent in front of a crowded velodrome and said he would take the test later at his hotel. The international judge ruled against the idea, and a scuffle ensued that involved Anquetil's manager, Raphaël Géminiani. In 1968, Ole Ritter broke the record in Mexico City, the first attempt at altitude since Willie Hamilton in 1898.

The record was improved several times over the next years, until Louise Roger reached  in 1897 also at Vélodrome Buffalo. In 1911 the longest standing men's or women's record (37 years) was set by the 157 cm (5 ft 2 in) tall Alfonsina Strada:  riding a 20 kg (44 lbs) machine. The first women's hour record approved by the UCI was by Tamara Novikova in 1955. However Lemaire's 1952 non-UCI record was not bettered until Elsy Jacobs' broke the 40 kmh barrier in 1958, the year Jacobs had won the inaugural women's road world championship. Jacobs' 1958 41.347 km UCI record would not be bettered until 1972.

Historical hour records

UCI hour record (1972–2014)

1972–1984: Merckx, Moser and new technology 

This was the first noted use of disc wheels, which provided an aerodynamic gain as well as Moser wearing a skin suit. Moser's record would eventually be moved in 1997 to "best human effort".

1990s: non-traditional riding positions 

In 1993 and 1994, Graeme Obree, who built his own bikes, posted two records with his hands tucked under his chest. Moser beat his 1984 record, using bullhorn handlebars, steel airfoil tubing, disk wheels and skinsuit. It was also faster than Obree's first record in 1993. Following the outlawing of the "praying mantis" style by the UCI in May 1994, Spaniard Miguel Induráin and Swiss Tony Rominger broke the record using a more traditional tri-bar setup with Rominger setting a distance of 55.291 km.

Chris Boardman took up the challenge using a modified version of the Lotus 110 bicycle, a successor to the earlier Lotus 108 bicycle he'd ridden to victory at the 1992 Olympic Games. South African company Aerodyne Technology built the frame. This too was considered controversial by the UCI, and while the record was allowed to stand, the position was banned making Boardman's record set in 1996, it was thought, effectively unbeatable using traditional bike position. The record stood as a best human effort until October 2022, when Filippo Ganna unified the records, beating Boardman's best human effort record (and Daniel Bigham's official UCI Hour record) on a traditionally shaped, though uniquely manufactured,  bicycle.

1997 UCI rule change 
With the increasing gap between modern bicycles and what was available at the time of Merckx's record, the UCI established two records in 1997:
UCI Hour Record: which restricted competitors to roughly the same equipment as Merckx, banning time trial helmets, disc or tri-spoke wheels, aerodynamic bars and monocoque frames.
Best Human Effort: also known as the UCI "Absolute" Record in which modern equipment was permitted.

As a result of the 1997 rule change, all records since 1972, including Boardman's  in 1996, were moved to Best Human Effort and the distance of Eddy Merckx set in 1972 once more became the official UCI benchmark.

In 2005, Ondřej Sosenka improved Boardman's performance at  using a 54×13 gear. However, Sosenka failed a doping control in 2001 and then again in 2008, the latter resulting in a career-ending suspension which puts in doubt the validity of his record. All women's records from 1986 to 1996 were recategorized to Best Human Effort.

Hour record holders (men's)

Hour record holders (women's)

UCI unified hour record (2014–present)

Unified rule change (2014) 

In 2014, the UCI unified the two classifications into a single classification in line with regulations for current track pursuit bikes. Records previously removed for Chris Boardman and Graeme Obree were returned, however the benchmark record would remain at  set in 2005 by Ondrej Sosenka, even though that was not the farthest distance. Under the new regulations riders may use any bike allowed by the UCI standards for endurance track events in place at the time of the attempt.

Riders are required to be part of the athlete biological passport program. Matthias Brändle was with IAM Cycling, then a UCI Professional Continental team. Jack Bobridge was on Team Budget Forklifts, an Australian UCI Continental team. Thomas Dekker had been released from World Tour team Garmin–Sharp several months before. Gustav Larsson was riding for the Professional Continental team Cult Energy Pro Cycling, whilst Bradley Wiggins had left the World Tour's  shortly before his attempt, which was made in the colours of his own UCI Continental team .

As of October 2022, 26 attempts have been made for the men's record, eight successfully, while nine attempts have been made on the women's record, six of them successfully.

Unified hour record attempts (men's) 
Following the change in the rules, German Jens Voigt became the first rider to attempt the hour, on 18 September 2014 at the Velodrome Suisse, Grenchen, Switzerland.

Further attempts by Australians Jack Bobridge and Rohan Dennis, and the Dutchman Thomas Dekker came within a few weeks, between 31 January and 25 February 2015. Dekker's attempt at the Aguascalientes Bicentenary Velodrome was the first attempt to take place at appreciable altitude. High altitude is thought to result in faster times, providing the rider takes the time to acclimatise to the conditions. This is because the air density decreases with an increase in altitude, which reduces the aerodynamic drag.

The UCI rules require an athlete to participate in its anti-doping system, including having a biological passport. When Daniel Bigham rode  to break Wiggins's British national record on 1 October 2021 he was ineligible to attempt the UCI record as he was not part of the anti-doping system, estimating it would cost him £8,000.

Unified hour record attempts (women's) 

In December 2014, it was announced that British Paralympian Sarah Storey would be the first woman to attempt the record following the unified rule change.

Van Houweling had set three new US Hour Records in the year prior. This last mark was also the Pan-American and World Masters Age 40–44 record at the time, and exceeded the distance of the UCI hour record of van Moorsel. However, it did not qualify as the UCI Hour Record because Van Houweling had only been enrolled in the athlete biological passport program for three and a half months prior to setting this record. The UCI requires that riders be enrolled in this program for 5–10 months before they are eligible to set this mark. From 24 August 2015, Van Houweling was eligible to attempt the UCI Hour Record.

In October 2015, Australian rider Bridie O'Donnell announced her intention to aim for the hour record in January 2016. She broke the women's hour at the Adelaide Super-Drome on 22 January 2016, riding . She was aged 41 years.

Italian rider Vittoria Bussi, after two unsuccessful attempts on 7 October 2017 and on 12 September 2018, broke Stevens' world record by 27 metres riding  on 13 September 2018.

Lowden completed a total of 193 laps of the Tissot Velodrome in Grenchen, Switzerland.

Statistics

Para-cycling records 

The new regulations for the making of accepted hour record attempts were extended to para-cycling in 2016. Although the first attempt on the hour record for women after the amendments to the regulations was made by Paralympian Sarah Storey, it was not a ratified attempt on the women's C5 hour record under the new conditions, which at that point still did not extend to paracycling – albeit that Storey's effort is recognized as a best C5 performance under the new rules, in addition to a British and masters world hour record in able-bodied cycling.

The first attempt on a para-cycling hour record after the new regulations were extended to para-cycling was by Irishman Colin Lynch in the C2 category, bettering the accepted best performance previously set by Laurent Thirionet in 1999 by 2 kilometres, and setting the first 'ratified' para-cycling world hour record. The mark of 43.133 km was achieved on 1 October at the National Cycling Centre in Manchester, Great Britain.

Men's UCI para-cycling hour record
Unified regulations (since 2016)

Women's UCI para-cycling hour record
Unified regulations (since 2016)

Historical para-cycling hour record 
Men's UCI para-cycling hour record – Best Hour Performance & Absolute Hour Record (1991–2016)

Women's UCI para-cycling hour record – Best Hour Performance & Absolute Hour Record (1991–2016)

Masters records

Current records by age-group

Men's UCI Masters best performances
Best Performances

Women's UCI Masters best performances
Best Performances

Junior records
Although the UCI does not recognise hour record attempts at the Junior age-group, there have been multiple record attempts made.

Other bicycle hour records 
There are many alternative bicycle hour records that do not fit the UCI-sanctioned categories.

Notes

References

External links 
 UCI hour records
 Bike Cult listing of Hour records including data on machines and athlete
 Hour records with pictures of Vehicles
 A recent timeline of the Hour Record from Cycling Weekly
 A history of the womens Hour Record from Cyclingtips

 
Cycling records and statistics
Events in track cycling
Sports world records